Mark Gallagher (born 12 February 2001) is a Scottish professional footballer who plays as a midfielder for Highland League side Formartine United. 

He made his League debut for Ross County against Greenock Morton in the Scottish Championship, coming on as a substitute. He joined Aberdeen in January 2020 on a two-and-a-half-year contract. In June 2021, Gallagher joined Scottish League Two side Forfar Athletic on a season-long loan. On 29 January 2022, Gallagher joined NIFL Premiership side Cliftonville on loan for the remainder of the 2021–22 season. After being released by Aberdeen in June 2022, Gallagher joined Highland League side Formartine United.

Career statistics

References

Living people
2001 births
Scottish footballers
Ross County F.C. players
Association football midfielders
Scottish Professional Football League players
People from Elgin, Moray
Aberdeen F.C. players
Cliftonville F.C. players
Sportspeople from Moray
Forfar Athletic F.C. players